Katherine Prescott or similar may refer to:

Kathryn Prescott, actress
Katherine Prescott, The Legend of Hell's Gate: An American Conspiracy character played by Jenna Dewan
Katherine T. Hooper Prescott, American artist at World's Columbian Exposition

See also
Katherine Prescott Wormeley, American nurse and author